Jill Talley (born December 19, 1962) is an American actress and comedian. She is a main cast member on the animated series SpongeBob SquarePants, in which she voices Karen Plankton. Her other voice roles include Sarah Dubois on Adult Swim's The Boondocks and Rita Loud on The Loud House.

Early life 
Talley was born in Chicago, Illinois. She graduated from Kennedy High School in 1981.

Career 
In her twenties, Talley performed improv comedy in Chicago at the Improv Institute and The Second City. Talley and her husband, Tom Kenny, were both cast members of the cult short-lived FOX Network sketch comedy show The Edge from 1992 to 1993  and sketch comedy show Mr. Show from 1995 to 1998. They also appeared together in the May 1996 video for "Tonight, Tonight" by The Smashing Pumpkins as a married couple who take a honeymoon on the moon.

Since 1999, Jill Talley has played Karen Plankton on SpongeBob SquarePants. She was promoted to a main cast member in the credits of its 2004 film adaptation. Talley's other vocal work includes playing several characters on Camp Lazlo (Gretchen, Nina, and Ms. Mucus) and playing Sarah Dubois on the Adult Swim show The Boondocks. She also voiced Lady Granite in the Plastic Man DC Nation Shorts and Maja the Sky Witch in the Adventure Time episode "Sky Witch”.

Since Mr. Shows run, she has also appeared in minor roles in several films such as Little Miss Sunshine and Sky High, in the latter of which she appeared with her husband.

 Personal life 
Talley first met Tom Kenny in 1992 while working on The Edge. They married in 1995 and have two children, Mack (born 1997) and Nora (born 2003).

 Filmography 

 Film 

 Television 

 Video games 

Impressions on The Edge
Carol Potter (as Cindy Walsh from Beverly Hills 90210)
Diana, Princess of Wales  
Jan Hooks (as Carlene Frazier-Dobber from Designing Women'')
Mia Farrow

References

External links 

1962 births
Living people
Actresses from Chicago
American film actresses
American sketch comedians
American television actresses
American video game actresses
American voice actresses
American women comedians
Comedians from Illinois
20th-century American actresses
21st-century American actresses
20th-century American comedians
21st-century American comedians
Animal impersonators
Nickelodeon people
Cartoon Network people
Disney people